This is a list of recording artists who have reached number one on the Mahasz Rádiós Top 40 airplay chart in Hungary since May 2002.* Hungarian Airplay Chart - archives from 2002 to present

All acts are listed alphabetically.
Solo artists are alphabetized by last name (unless they use only their first name, e.g. Akon, listed under A), Groups by group name excluding "a," "an" and "the."
Featured artists that have been given credit on the record are included

A

A7S (2)
Bryan Adams (1)
Adele (2)
Afrojack (1)
 Agebeat & Kovary (1)
Christina Aguilera (1)
Akon (1)
Ákos (1)
Alcazar (1)
Alesso (1)
Anastacia (1)
ATB (1)
Au/Ra (1)
The Avener (1)
Avicii (9)
Asaf Avidan (1)
Axwell & Ingrosso (1)

B

B.o.B (1)
Backstreet Boys (1)
Baby Gabi (1)
Gnarls Barkley (1)
Gary Barlow (1)
Lauren Bennett (1)
Beyoncé (2)
Justin Bieber (1)
Black Eyed Peas (1)
Aloe Blacc (1)
Blue (1)
Jonas Blue (1)
James Blunt (3)
DJ Bobo (1)
Bogi (1)
Brando (1)
ByeAlex (2)

C

Camila Cabello (2)
Graham Candy (1)
Mariah Carey (1)
Kelly Clarkson (1)
Clean Bandit (2)
Club 54 (1)
Cheryl Cole (1)
Phil Collins (1)
Cookin' on 3 Burners (1)
The Corrs (1)
Joel Corry (1)
Miley Cyrus (1)

D

Gigi D'Agostino (2)
Daft Punk (1)
Dakota (1)
Ray Dalton (1)
Craig David (1)
Jason Derulo (1)
Janieck Devy (1)
Dido (1)
Alesha Dixon (1)
Duffy (1)
Duran Duran (1)
Dynoro (1)

E

Fleur East (1)
Steve Edwards (1)
Billie Eilish (1)
Eminem (1)
Nathan Evans (1)
Example (1)

F

Alle Farben (2)
Gia Farrell (1)
Farruko (1)
Fergie (1)
Melanie Fiona (1)
Florence and the Machine (1)
Luis Fonsi (1)
Freshlyground (1)
Flo Rida (2)
Nelly Furtado (3)

G

Lady Gaga (4)
Galantis (1)
Gayle (1)
Jess Glynne (1)
Tom Grennan (1)
Selena Gomez (1)
Goodboys (1)
GoonRock (1)
Gotye (1)
Ellie Goulding (1)
 GrooveHouse (2)
David Guetta (6)

H

Calvin Harris (9)
Gábor Heincz (1)
Oliver Heldens (1)
Ella Henderson (1)
Keri Hilson (1)
Hooligans (3)
James Hype (1)

I

Enrique Iglesias (1)
Imagine Dragons (1)
Natalie Imbruglia (1)
In-Grid (1)
Ilira (2)

J

Felix Jaehn (1)
Jay-Z (1)
Jax Jones (2)
Carly Rae Jepsen (1)
Jessie J (1)
JID (1)
Juanes (2)
Jem (1)
Elton John (2)
JXL (1)

K

Fritz Kalkbrenner (1)
 Kamrad (1)
Kaskade (1)
Dermot Kennedy (1)
Kesha (2)
Las Ketchup (1)
Alicia Keys (1)
Master KG (1)
The Kid Laroi (1)
DJ Khaled (1)
Wiz Khalifa (1)
Kimbra (1)
Sean Kingston (1)
Viktor Király (2)
Lenny Kravitz (1)
Chad Kroeger (1)
K.Maro (1)
Kungs (1)
Kwabs (1)
Kygo (3)

L

 LA Vision (1)
Kendrick Lamar (1)
Adam Lambert (1)
Lányi Lala (1)
Magna Cum Laude (1)
Lemar (1)
Leona Lewis (1)
Lilly Wood and the Prick (1)
Little Mix (1)
Dua Lipa (4)
LMFAO (1)
 Lotfi Begi (2)
Jennifer Lopez (1)
Loreen (1)
Lost Frequencies (3)
Loud Luxury (1)
Demi Lovato (1)

M

MØ (1)
Mabel (1)
Madcon (1)
Mad'House (1)
Madonna (7)
Major Lazer (1)
Skip Marley (1)
Maroon 5 (5)
Bruno Mars (3)
Marshmello (1)
Sam Martin (1)
Conor Maynard (1)
Ava Max (5)
Tate McRae (1)
Meduza (1)
Sérgio Mendes (1)
Shawn Mendes (1)
Mihály Mező (1)
M.I.A. (1)
George Michael (1)
Milk & Sugar (1)
Nicki Minaj (1)
Minelli (2)
MNEK (1)
Moguai (1)
Mr. Probz (1)

N
Nabiha (1)
Nayer (1)
Nea (1)
Nelly (1)
Ne-Yo (2)
John Newman (1)
 Newik (1)
Momcedo (1)
Maty Noyes (1)

O

Oceana (1)
OMI (1)
OneRepublic (2)

P

Sean Paul (1)
Halott Pénz (3)
Katy Perry (5)
Pink (5)
Pitbull (2)
Pixa & Stereo Palma (1)
Elvis Presley (1)
The Pussycat Dolls (2)

R

Gigi Radics (2)
Rag'n'Bone Man (2)
Eros Ramazzotti (2)
The Rasmus (1)
Red Hot Chili Peppers (1)
Bebe Rexha (2)
Busta Rhymes (1)
Rihanna (10)
Riton (1)
 Szikora Robi (1)
Nicky Romero (1)
Mark Ronson (1)
 Miggy Dela Rosa (1)
Kelly Rowland (2)
Magdi Rúzsa (1)
Kate Ryan (1)

S

Santana (1)
András Kállay-Saunders (1)
Robin Schulz (3)
Marc Scibilia (1)
Conrad Sewell (1)
Shakira (6)
Ed Sheeran (2)
Shouse (1)
Sia (4)
Sigma (1)
Eva Simons (1)
Bob Sinclar (1)
DJ Snake (1)
Sam Smith (1)
Snoop Dogg (1)
Alexandra Stan (1)
Sting (1)
Harry Styles (1)
The Sugababes (1)
SZA (1)

T

T.I. (1)
Robin Thicke (1)
Rob Thomas (1)
Jasmine Thompson (1)
Tiësto (1)
Bryson Tiller (1)
Justin Timberlake (3)
Timbaland (3)
Tomcraft (1)
Tones and I (1)
Topic (2)
Train (2)

U

 Unique (1)

V

Valmar (1)
Viktor Varga (1)
Ella Vos (1)
V-Tech (1)
Vula (1)

W

The Weeknd (2)
Well Hello (3)
will.i.am (1)
Pharrell Williams (3)
Robbie Williams (3)
Chris Willis (1)
Amy Winehouse (1)
Wisin (1)
Kati Wolf (1)
Ina Wroldsen (1)

Y

Daddy Yankee (1)
Young Thug (1)

Z

Zanzibar (1)
Zondering (1)

See also 

 List of number-one singles of the 2000s (Hungary)
 List of number-one singles of the 2010s (Hungary)
 List of number-one singles of the 2020s (Hungary)
Mahasz

External links 
 MAHASZ official website

References

Hungary
Number one